Meyer Rock is a pinnacle rock  northwest of McDonald Island in the McDonald Islands. This feature was charted as "Meyers Rock" on an 1874 chart by the British Challenger expedition, but the form Meyer Rock is now approved. Captain Johann Meyer of the German ship La Rochelle sighted the island group in 1857, not realizing the prior discovery by Captain William McDonald in 1854.

References

Rock formations of Antarctica